ETS domain-containing protein Elk-3 is a protein that in humans is encoded by the ELK3 gene.

The protein encoded by this gene is a member of the ETS-domain transcription factor family and the ternary complex factor (TCF) subfamily. Proteins in this subfamily regulate transcription when recruited by serum response factor to bind to serum response elements. This protein is activated by signal-induced phosphorylation; studies in rodents suggest that it is a transcriptional inhibitor in the absence of Ras, but activates transcription when Ras is present.

Interactions
ELK3 has been shown to interact with TCF3.

References

Further reading

External links 
 

Transcription factors